North Main Street Historic District is a national historic district located at Mocksville, Davie County, North Carolina. The district encompasses 115 contributing buildings and 2 contributing sites in a linear residential section of Mocksville. It was developed between the 1840s and World War II and includes notable examples of Greek Revival, Italianate, Gothic Revival, Queen Anne, Classical Revival, Shingle Style, American Craftsman, Tudor Revival, and Colonial Revival style residential  architecture.  Also in the district are the First Methodist Church (1896), the Mocksville Graded School (1911), and the Masonic Picnic Grounds, established in 1883.

Few of its buildings were designed by architects, but the Dr. R.P. Anderson House (1903), at 665 N. Main St., was built from mail order plans of architects Barber & Klutz of Nashville, Tennessee.

It was added to the National Register of Historic Places in 1990.

References

Historic districts on the National Register of Historic Places in North Carolina
Italianate architecture in North Carolina
Greek Revival architecture in North Carolina
Queen Anne architecture in North Carolina
Neoclassical architecture in North Carolina
Tudor Revival architecture in North Carolina
Colonial Revival architecture in North Carolina
Buildings and structures in Davie County, North Carolina
National Register of Historic Places in Davie County, North Carolina